Cheese is the debut album by Belgian musician Stromae, released on 14 June 2010. The songs "Bienvenue chez moi", "House'llelujah", "Rail de Musique", "Peace or Violence", "Te Quiero" and "Silence" were released as album-promo-singles, only "Rail de Musique" and "Bienvenue Chez Moi" did not chart. It features three official singles including the hit "Alors on danse", "Te Quiero" and "House'llelujah".

Track listing

Personnel
Lead vocals, programming
Stromae

Management
Dimitri Borrey

Mastered By
Pieter Wagter "Equus"

Production
Mosaert - producer
Lion Hell Capouillez - mixing
Vince Lattuca  - mixing
Dati Bendo - Artwork
Guillaume Mortier - Artwork
Luc Junior Tam - Artwork
Romain Biharz - Artwork
Dati Bendo - photography

Charts

Weekly charts

Certifications

References

External links 
Official site

2010 debut albums
Stromae albums
French-language albums
European Border Breakers Award-winning albums